This name uses Eastern Slavic naming customs, the patronymic is Majitovich and the surname is Abdullaev.

Shamshad Majitovich Abdullaev (Russian: Шамшад Маджитович Абдуллаев, born November 1, 1957) is an Uzbek poet, essayist, writer and translator. He is the founder of the Fergana School of Russian language poetry.

Abdullaev was born in Fergana, then part of the Uzbek Soviet Socialist Republic, and attended the local Fergana Pedagogical institute, graduating in 1979 with a degree in Russian literature. From 1991–1995, Abdullaev was also the final editor-in-chief of Tashkent-based poetry journal Star of the East (Zvezda Vostoka). His first poetry compilation book, titled The Gap, was published in Saint Petersburg, Russia by local magazine Mitin. The Gap received critical acclaim and won Abdullaev the prestigious Andrei Bely Prize in 1994.

He is a contributor to Words Without Borders, where he has published several of his poems: "On the Death of Jean Vigo", "Midday 1975", and "Family", all originally written in Russian.

Career

Early career 
Abdullaev attended the Fergana Pedagogical Institute from 1975 to 1979, where he specialized in Russian literature. In the early 1990s, he moved to Tashkent just before the collapse of the Soviet Union, and found employment at a local paper, Star of the East (Zvezda Vostok). Founded in 1932 by the Uzbek Communist Party, the magazine  published literary and poetic anthologies by Uzbek writers. In 1991, Adbullaev became the editor-in-chief of the magazine's poetry section. The magazine experienced modest local success, however Abdullaev's work soon began gaining international recognition.

In 1992, Abdullaev published his first collection of poems, Intermediate (Russian: Промежуток). The book, which incorporates the strands of modernism with utopianism as well as Soviet and Central Asian mythological symbolism, received widespread acclaim in Uzbekistan, Russia, and much of the post-Soviet world, where it was lauded for its use of modernism in a distinctly Central Asian style.

In 1994, he had a breakthrough with his book of poetry The Gap, which received widespread circulation and attention in the Russophone world.

That year he was recognized with the Andrei Bely Prize, becoming the first writer from Uzbekistan to win Russia's most prestigious unofficial literary award.

This resulted in backlash from more traditional communist segments of Uzbekistan's population, as well as the emerging nationalist fraction of Uzbek poets, who were dismayed by his use of Russian. As a result, Abdullaev was forced to resign from his position of editor-in-chief at Zvezda Vostok in 1995.

Recognition abroad 
After leaving Zvezda Vostok, Abdullaev began publishing his poetry outside of Uzbekistan, notably in Russia. His poems were published in a number of independent Russian literary journals, including St. Petersburg-based Mitin and Yekaterinburg-based Ural Novye.

In 1997, Abdullaev self-published a collection of poems, Slow Summer (Russian: медленное лето). The book received critical acclaim in Russia and won Abdullaev the Banner Magazine Prize in 1998. Also in 1997, Abdullaev published a Russian-Finnish anthology called Who Says (Russian: Кто говорит), which dealt with the cultural relationship between the two nations. It was compiled and translated by Y. Mullinen. These compilations won Abdullaev the Banner Magazine prize, handed out by the Russian literary magazine Znamya in 1998.

In 2003, Abdullaev published his fourth book of poetry, Fixed Surface.

International Collaborations 
In 2012, Abdullaev, along with other writers including Fanny Rubio and Rainer Rilke, was featured in a poetry compilation, Two Lines 19: Passageways. The compilation, published by the Center for the Art of Translation, features various poems from authors around the world sharing their unique experiences.

In 2015, Abdullaev participated in Your Language My Ear, an international poetry symposium dedicated to Russian poetry in translation and held at the University of Pennsylvania. He appeared alongside Polina Barskova, Keti Chukhrov, Alexandra Petrova, and Aleksandr Skidan, as well as a number of other important translators. Several of Abdullaev's poems translated at this event have since been published in English.

In April 2017, Abdullaev teamed up with Words Without Borders' online magazine to release three new poems, translated by Alex Cigale and Dana Golin, respectively.

Fergana School 
Abdullaev is the founder and most prominent poet of the so-called Fergana School of poetry, which is based in his hometown. He founded the school in 1990 along with fellow Uzbek poets Hamid Ismailov and Khamdam Zakhirov.

Despite being located in Uzbekistan, the school primarily publishes poetry in Russian. Abdullaev has said that the reason he does not publish more poems in the Uzbek language is because he views his poems as forms of intercultural dialogue between Post-Soviet peoples. His poems can be best described as contrasting the cultures, customs and nuances of Central Asia with distinctively Western principles and theories, in the hopes of creating a dialogue between the two different cultures. The declarative function of the Fergana School is to start a "neutral dialogue" between the East and West with poetry that speaks to both sides.

Reception 
Abdullaev's poetry in particular has received praise outside of Russia. It has been described as "cinematic"  "utopian" and "avant-garde."

In his article "The World's Central Asian Heart: The Poetry of Shamshad Abdullaev," Kevin M.F. Platt described Abdullaev's poetry as "dense" and "roving," while lauding the poet for his combination of sensuality and materialism in his work.

However, Abdullaev's work has also generated considerable controversy within Uzbekistan. It was heavily criticized by the Uzbek government, particularly during the Presidency of Islam Karimov. In the 1990s the government-backed writer's union accused Abdullaev of attempting to hinder the development of the Uzbek language through his use of Russian, as well as undermining Central Asian culture.

Personal life 
An ethnic Uzbek, Abdullaev has lived his whole life in Fergana, with brief residency in Tashkent when he worked at Zvezda Vostok. He is an accomplished polyglot, fluent in both Uzbek and Russian, as well as conversational English.

Honours and awards 

 Andrei Bely Prize, 1994
Znamya Prize, 1998
 Russian Prize of the Boris Yeltsin Centre (2006, 2013)
 American Academy in Rome Joseph Brodsky Memorial Fellowship Fund (resident, 2015)

See also 

 Hamid Ismailov
 List of Russian-language poets

References

External links 

 Complete English bibliography

Uzbekistani writers
Uzbekistani translators
Living people
1957 births